The Mechanoids is a science fiction role-playing game published by Palladium Books in 1985 that is based on the earlier role-playing game The Mechanoid Invasion.

Description
The Mechanoids is set one month after the events described in the original The Mechanoid Invasion, an alien invasion by a race known as the Mechanoids, who are bent on destroying humanity. The players must try to find out more about the plans of the Mechanoids, and search for ancient weapons buried deep in the Earth that can help them. 

The book includes character generation, a timeline of the alien invasion that forms the focus of the game, notable people, weapons, information about the Mechanoid aliens, and ancient weapons. The book also includes five adventures:
"Little Mechanoid Lost"
"Run to Ramtau" 
"The Rescue of Doctor Druall" 
"Survival"
"The Ocean's Outrage"

Publication history
Palladium Books published The Mechanoid Invasion, their first role-playing game, in 1981, followed by sequels The Journey and Homeworld. In 1984, Palladium undertook a major revision of their role-playing rules, and the following year, Palladium published The Mechanoids, which incorporated the new rules as well as a continuation of the original storyline. The result was a 168-page softcover book written by Kevin Siembieda, with artwork by Siembieda and Michael Gustovich.

In the 2014 book Designers & Dragons: The '80s, game historian Shannon Appelcline explained that after Palladium expanded their role-playing system in 1984, "The next year The Mechanoids (1985) returned, with a new book that again advanced the storyline. With three different games under its belt Palladium was by now — alongside Chaosium and Hero — a leader in producing multi-genre house systems. However, Palladium='s RPGs to date were less successful than the company’s books of weapons and armor."

Reception
In the August 1986 edition of White Dwarf (Issue #80), Marcus L. Rowland felt that the additions of ancient weapon technology "unfortunately [...] have taken away some of the atmosphere of the original game; in the first book it was obvious that the humans stood no chance of winning, but in this new release there seems to be some hope." Rowland also felt that the game was fundamentally flawed as a role-playing game: "There isn't much for players to do, apart from fighting the Mechanoids, so scenarios tend to be somewhat simplistic and repetitive." Rather than a role-playing game, Rowland suggested that "this system would work better as a tactical/strategy war game." He concluded with a thumbs down, saying, "I didn't like this game much, since I tend to prefer roleplaying to combat systems, but more violent GMs and players may find it has something to offer."

References

Role-playing game supplements introduced in 1985
Science fiction role-playing game supplements